"Sun Glasses" is a song originally released by Skeeter Davis in 1965, which was written by John D. Loudermilk. In 1984, Tracey Ullman released a version of the song titled "Sunglasses", which became an international hit.

Skeeter Davis version
Skeeter Davis's version reached No. 16 on Record Worlds Top Country Singles chart, No. 19 on Cash Boxs Country Top 50, and No. 30 on Billboards Hot Country Singles chart.

In 1966, Davis was nominated for a Grammy Award for Best Country & Western Vocal Performance - Female for her rendition of "Sun Glasses".

Chart performance

Tracey Ullman version
In 1984, Tracey Ullman released a version of the song titled "Sunglasses". Ullman's version spent 9 weeks on the UK Singles Chart, peaking at No. 18, while reaching No. 6 on Austria's Ö3 Hit wähl mit chart, No. 13 on Sweden's Topplistan, and No. 18 on the Irish Singles Chart.

Chart performance

References

1965 songs
1965 singles
1984 singles
Skeeter Davis songs
Tracey Ullman songs
Songs written by John D. Loudermilk
Song recordings produced by Chet Atkins
Song recordings produced by Peter Collins (record producer)
RCA Victor singles
Stiff Records singles